Michelle Jaggard and Lisa O'Neill defeated Leila Meskhi and Natasha Zvereva in the final, 7–6(7–3), 6–7(4–7), 6–4 to win the girls' doubles tennis title at the 1986 Wimbledon Championships.

Seeds
The top 3 seeds received a bye into the second round. 

  Alexia Dechaume /  Sybille Niox-Château (quarterfinals)
  Gisele Miró /  Patricia Tarabini (quarterfinals)
  Kim Il-soon /  Jennifer Saberon (semifinals)
  Gisele Faria /  Frédérique Martin (quarterfinals)
  Wiltrud Probst /  Eva-Maria Schürhoff (semifinals)
  Leila Meskhi /  Natasha Zvereva (final)
  Karen Deed /  Nicole Provis (second round)
  Michelle Jaggard /  Lisa O'Neill (champions)

Draw

Finals

Top half

Bottom half

References

External links

Girls' Doubles
1986